William Best (May 27, 1913 – February 27, 1962), known professionally as Willie Best or Sleep n' Eat, was an American television and film actor.

Best was one of the first African American film actors and comedians to become well known. In the 21st century, his work, like that of Stepin Fetchit, is sometimes reviled because he was often called upon to play stereotypically lazy, illiterate, and/or simple-minded characters in films. Of the 124 films he appeared in, he received screen credit in at least 77, an unusual feat for an African American bit player.

Stage
A native of Sunflower, Mississippi, Best reached Hollywood as a chauffeur for a vacationing couple. He decided to stay in the region and began his performing career with a traveling show in southern California. He was regularly hired as a character actor in Hollywood films after a talent scout discovered him on stage.

Motion pictures

Willie Best appeared in more than one hundred films of the 1930s and 1940s. Although several sources state that for years he was billed only as "Sleep n' Eat", Best received credit under this moniker instead of his real name in only six movies: his first film as a bit player (Harold Lloyd's Feet First) and in Up Pops the Devil (1931), The Monster Walks (1932), Kentucky Kernels and West of the Pecos (both 1934), and Murder on a Honeymoon (1935). He thereafter usually received credit as "Willie Best" or "William Best".

In his early films Best clearly imitated Stepin Fetchit, delivering dialogue slowly in a thick and almost incoherent dialect, and reacting to things with a pop-eyed stare and slack-jawed amazement or bewilderment. Best later refined his screen character, abandoning the Fetchit mannerisms but retaining his natural comic reactions and dialect. In reality he was far from the slow-witted clown he often portrayed; he was well aware of being typecast as "lazy darkey" characters: "I often think about these roles I have to play. Most of them are pretty broad. Sometimes I tell the director and he cuts out the bad parts... But what's an actor going to do? Either you do it or get out." Best had genuine dramatic ability, as seen in the 1940 short subject Minstrel Days: Best wants to be an actor, and demonstrates his original song to a vaudevillian. The vaudevillian promptly steals Best's song and becomes a star, leaving Best to poignantly lament his own fate.

Mitchell Leisen, who directed Willie Best in Suddenly It's Spring, described him as "the most natural actor I've ever seen." Comedian Bob Hope similarly acclaimed him as "the best actor I know", while the two were working together in 1940 on The Ghost Breakers.

As a supporting actor, Best, like many black actors of his era, was regularly cast in domestic worker or service-oriented roles (though a few times he played the role echoing his previous occupation as a private chauffeur). He was often seen making a brief comic turn as a hotel, airline, or train porter, as well as an elevator operator, custodian, butler, valet, waiter, deliveryman, and once as a launch pilot (in the 1939 movie Mr. Moto in Danger Island). Willie Best received screen credit most of the time, which was unusual for "bit players"; most in the 1930s and 1940s were not accorded due credit. This also happened to white actors in small roles, but black actors were not credited even when their roles were larger. In more than 80 of his movies, he was given a proper character name (as opposed to simple descriptions such as "room service waiter" or "shoe-shine boy"), beginning with his second film.

He also played the character of "Hipp" in three of RKO’s six Scattergood Baines films with Guy Kibbee: Scattergood Baines (1941), Scattergood Survives a Murder (1942), and Cinderella Swings It in 1943. Actor Paul White, who played a young version of Best’s "Hipp" in the first film, went on to play "Hipp" in the next three films; Best returned to the role in the last two.

Mantan Moreland, one of Willie Best's contemporaries, played "Birmingham Brown" the chauffeur in the Charlie Chan films. When Moreland took temporary leave of the series to tour in vaudeville, Willie Best took over Moreland's role (as "Chattanooga Brown") in The Red Dragon in 1945 and Dangerous Money in 1946.

Arrests
Best was fond of using recreational narcotics, which resulted in at least two well-publicized arrests. In 1942 he was arrested for possession of marijuana, and in 1951 he was arrested for possession of heroin. The 1951 arraignment resulted in a $250 fine and three years' probation. The adverse publicity hurt Best's career; he would make no further films after the 1951 Roy Rogers western South of Caliente.

Television
Willie Best was rescued from professional oblivion by veteran producer Hal Roach, who regarded Best as one of the greatest talents he had ever met. Roach didn't care about Best's personal life as long as Best remained professional in acting roles. Best worked almost exclusively for Roach in 1950s television. He played Willie, the house servant/handyman and close friend of the title character of the Stu Erwin sitcom The Trouble with Father, for its entire run from 1950 to 1955. He became familiar to early-TV audiences as Charlie, the elevator operator on CBS's My Little Margie, from 1953 to 1955.  He also played Billy Slocum in the syndicated drama Waterfront (1954). Perhaps his most surprising television work was in a Christmas-themed episode of Racket Squad, in which he played a straight character role without comedy or dialect.

Death
Best died on February 27, 1962, at the Motion Picture Country Home in Woodland Hills, California, of cancer at age 48. He was buried (by the Motion Picture Fund) on March 5, 1962, at Valhalla Memorial Park Cemetery.

Legacy
Best's "Sleep n' Eat" moniker surfaced again in the 2000 motion picture satire Bamboozled, directed by Spike Lee. In the film a "twenty-first-century minstrel show" is televised starring two African American performers, one of whom (portrayed by Tommy Davidson) plays a character named "Sleep n' Eat".  In a nod to Mantan Moreland, his on-stage counterpart is named "Mantan".

Filmography

See also

Stepin Fetchit
Mantan Moreland
Fred Toones
Blue Washington
Blackface

References

External links

1913 births
1962 deaths
20th-century American male actors
African-American male actors
American male film actors
American male television actors
Burials at Valhalla Memorial Park Cemetery
Deaths from cancer in California
Male actors from Mississippi
People from Sunflower, Mississippi
20th-century African-American people